The etymology of the surname Morrison is either Anglo-Norman, commonly found throughout England, Scotland and Ireland, or from the Clan Morrison, a Scottish clan originally from Sutherland and the Isle of Lewis (Eilean Leòdhais) in Scotland.

History
Morrison in England is traditionally believed to be a patronymic of Maurice/Morris, introduced into England following the Norman invasion in 1066.

In Scotland there is strong evidence that other surnames of Anglo Norman origin such as Moir, Muir and More, were equally influential as potential multiple origin points for the derivative of the modern spelling of Morrison. This is supported by evidence including the association of Moor or Saracen head(s) on some Moor, Moore, More, Mores, Morrison, Mure and Muir family crests. While the Highland Clan Morrison derives from Mac Ghille Mhoire, or servants of Mary, the lowland Clan Morrison Society of Scotland, registered their arms featuring three Moor heads in 1919, demonstrating the symbolic similarity between all these families.

Historical evidence suggests many early surnames in Scotland were nuanced and altered by such simple devices as phonetic interpretations by religious scribes. For example, Scottish records identify a marriage in 1584 between George Morese and Babara Forguson in Aberdeen. Later in other Aberdeen records their names become George Moreson and Barbara Ferguson, then George Morrison and Barbara Ferguson.  Similar Morrison name evolutions are recorded in Edinburgh at this time. Those from the Clan Morrison may originally have been anglicised to Morison, with Morrison becoming more widely used later on.

Another form of name changing came through rebranding of surnames. This occurred in Scotland for both convenience or necessity to disguise a Scottish Highland name, for example, McCoinnich describes the adoption of the name Morrison on the Isle of Lewis (Eilean Leòdhais) around 1640 by families formerly known as "McBrief" or "mac a’ Bhritheimh". Alexander Morison (Heraldry of the Clan MacGhille-mhuire) makes the statement that the name is from ancestors who were vassals or adherents of the jarls of More or Moeri in Norway.

Perhaps the earliest recording of the recognisable surname Morrison is found in the English Yorkshire Poll Tax records in 1379 for "Ricardus Morisson”. Some fifty years later in Scotland there is a Morrison recorded as "Arthuro Morison domino de Darleith" being a witness to the "Resignation by John MacRoger of Gleane MacKerne, in favour of John of Culquoune of Luss, of Gleane Mackecherne, etc. 7th February 1429". The spelling Morrison became more popular over Morisson and Morison later on.

Following the gradual introduction of surnames in England, Scotland and Ireland many names such as Mirryson, Mirrison, Morisson, Morisone, Morrieson, Morriceson, Morason, Moorison, Mooresone, Morisoun, Moresoun, Murison, Muirison, Murieson, Murrison, Muresoun, Muirsoun and no doubt many other phonetic synonyms or Anglicised adaptations evolved and were standardised to become Morrison, Morison or Murison. Such standardisation in Scotland came after 1854 when Lord Elcho (Francis Richard Chateris, 10th Earl of Weymss) finally succeeded in framing An Act to Provide for the Better Registration of Births, Deaths and Marriages in Scotland, 31 May 1854.

Overall there is a common inconsistency in the  spelling of Morrison or Morison in many records throughout England, Scotland, and Ireland. There is no particular rule or convention that specifies which spelling should be used. Morrison and Morison families today are widely distributed across England, Scotland and Ireland and in many cases with no common genetic or family ancestry. Morison is typically the older spelling of ancestors of the Clan Morrison from Sutherland and the Eilean Leòdhais, with Morrison being the more commonly used now.

People with the surname
A. B. Morrison (1878–1967), American college sports coach
Adam Morrison (born 1984), American basketball player
Agnes Morrison (1867–1934), British charity fund-raiser
Aileen Morrison (born 1982), Irish triathlete
Alan Morrison (general) (1927–2008), Major General in the Australian Army
Alan Morrison (lawyer), American Supreme Court litigator, co-founder of Public Citizen
Alan Morrison (organist), American musician
Alan Morrison (poet) (born 1974), British poet
Alan Morrison (racing driver) (born 1968), British race-car driver
Alasdair Morrison (banker), Scottish banker
Alasdair Morrison (politician), Scottish Labour Party politician
Alastair Ardoch Morrison (1911–1998), Australian graphic artist and author
Alex Morrison (Canadian Forces officer) (born 1941), former lieutenant colonel of the Canadian Forces
Alexander Morrison (botanist) (1849–1913), born Scotland, Australian
Alexander Morrison (headmaster) (1829–1903), born Scotland, Australian headmaster of Scotch College
Alexander Morrison (judge) (born 1927), British judge
Alexander Morrison (politician) (1851–1930), Canadian Member of Parliament
Alexander B. Morrison (born 1930), Canadian scientist, academic, civil servant and leader in The Church of Jesus Christ of Latter-day Saints
Alexandra Morrison, Canadian photographer
Allan Morrison (trader), Canadian-American fur trader and politician active in Minnesota
Andrew Morrison (disambiguation), several persons
Angus Morrison (minister), Moderator of the General Assembly of the Church of Scotland 2015–2016
Angus Morrison (pianist) (1902-1989), English pianist and teacher 
Angus James Morrison (1900–1952), Canadian politician
Arthur Morrison (1863–1945), English author and journalist
Barb Morrison (born 1967), American record producer
Blake Morrison (born 1950), British poet and author
Father Brian Morrison (1933–2009) Charity worker, Priest
Brendan Morrison (born 1975), Canadian hockey player
Bret Morrison (1912–1978), American actor
Brooke Morrison (born 1979), Australian field hockey player
Bruce Morrison (born 1944), American politician
Bruce Morrison (cricketer) (born 1933), New Zealand cricketer
Cameron Morrison (1869–1953), American politician
Charles Morrison (cricketer) (1883–1948), West Indian cricketer
Charles Clayton Morrison (1874–1966), American Disciples of Christ minister and Christian socialist
Chick Morrison (1878–1924), American silent film actor
Chris Morrison (disambiguation)
Clinton Morrison (born 1979), Irish footballer
Connie Morrison, American politician and businesswoman
Daniel Morrison (disambiguation)
Dan Morrison (umpire), umpire in Major League Baseball
Dan Morrison (wrestler) (born 1974), American professional wrestler
Daniel Morrison, Royal New Zealand Ballet
Daniel Morrison, actor who played Chris Sharpe in Degrassi: The Next Generation
Danny Morrison (writer) (born 1953), Irish republican writer and activist
Danny Morrison (cricketer) (born 1966), New Zealand cricketer
Danny Morrison (sports executive), President of the Carolina Panthers
David Morrison (disambiguation)
Dave Morrison (footballer), footballer
David Morrison, Australian army officer
David Morrison (astrophysicist)
Dave Morrison (ice hockey) (born 1962), hockey player
Dave Morrison (poet)
Dave Morrison (soccer) (born 1957) American soccer player
Deborah K. Morrison, American cell biologist 
deLesseps Story Morrison (1912–1964), Mayor of New Orleans, Louisiana 1946–1961
deLesseps Morrison Jr. (1944–1996), Louisiana politician and son of deLesseps Story Morrison
Des Morrison (boxer), Jamaican/British boxer of the 1970s and '80s
Dorilus Morrison (1814–1898), American politician
Ebony Morrison (born 1999), Liberian Olympic athlete
Ellis Morrison, American politician
Emmett Morrison (1915–1993), American basketball player
Frances Morrison (1807–1898), British activist
Francis Moryson (before 1628 – c. 1681), Virginia colonial politician
Frank Morrison (disambiguation)
Fynes Moryson (1566–1630), English traveller and writer
Geanie Morrison (born 1950), American politician
George Morrison (artist) (1919–2000), American artist
George Morrison (documentary maker) (born 1922), Irish filmmaker
George Morrison (director, acting teacher) (born 1928), US acting teacher, teaches at The New Actors Workshop
George Morrison (ice hockey) (born 1948), National Hockey League player
George Morrison (Northern Ireland politician), member of the Vanguard Progressive Unionist Party
George Morrison (British politician) (George Alexander Morrison) (1869–1956), Liberal (then National Liberal) Member of Parliament for the Combined Scottish Universities
George D. Morrison (1890–1973), American actor better known as Pete Morrison
George Ernest Morrison (1862–1920), Australian adventurer known as Chinese Morrison
George F. Morrison (1867–1943), American electric executive
George Ivan Morrison (born 1945), birth name of singer/songwriter Van Morrison
George M. Morrison (born 1902), lawyer and political figure in Nova Scotia, Canada
George Pitt Morison (1861–1946), Australian painter and engraver
George S. Morison (engineer) (1845–1903), American engineer and bridge designer
George S. Morrison (diplomat) (c. 1830 – 1893), British diplomat
George Stephen Morrison (1919–2008), U.S. Navy Admiral and father of The Doors singer Jim Morrison
George W. Morrison (1809–1888), U.S. Representative from New Hampshire
Grant Morrison (born 1960), Scottish comic book writer and artist
Greg Morrison (born 1965), Canadian writer and composer
Henry Morrison (cricketer) (1850–1913), New Zealand cricketer for Otago
Henry C. Morrison (1871–1945), American educator
Henry Clay Morrison (1857–1942), American evangelist and Asbury College president
Henry Morrison Flagler (1830–1913), American industrialist
Herbert Morrison (1888–1965), British politician
Howard Morrison (1935–2009), New Zealand singer
Hugh Morrison (Manitoba politician) (1892–1957), Progressive Conservative member of the Legislative Assembly of Manitoba
Hugh Morrison (UK politician) (1868–1931), British Conservative Party Member of Parliament
Ian Morrison (disambiguation)
James Morrison (disambiguation)
Jane Morrison, runaway slave and plaintiff in the 1857 case Morrison v. White
Jason Morrison (disambiguation)
Jennifer Morrison (born 1979), American actress
Jim Morrison (1943–1971), American singer-songwriter
Joe Morrison, NFL football player
John Morrison (disambiguation)
Joseph Curran Morrison (1816–1885), lawyer, judge and political figure in Canada West
Joseph G. Morrison (1871–1947), minister and general superintendent in the Church of the Nazarene
Joseph Wanton Morrison (1783–1826), British soldier in the War of 1812
Keith Morrison (born 1944), Canadian journalist
Ken Morrison (1931–2017), English businessman
Ken Morrison (producer) (born 1957), American television producer
Kenny Morrison (born 1974), American actor
Kerensia Morrison, Jamaican politician
Kirk Morrison  (born 1982), American football linebacker
Kirk Morrison (poker player) (fl. since 1994), American poker player
Logan Morrison, American baseball player
Margaret Morrison (born 1960), American Painter 
Margaret Morrison (philosopher) (1954–2021), Canadian philosopher
Marin Morrison (1990–2009), American Paralympic swimmer
Marion Morrison (1907–1979), birth name of John Wayne, American actor
Mark Morrison, R&B singer
Mark Morrison (ice hockey b. 1963), Canadian
Mark Morrison (ice hockey b. 1982), Northern Irishman
Mark Coxon Morrison, Scottish rugby union footballer
Matthew Morrison (born 1978), American actor
Mateo Morrison, Dominican author
Father Michael Morrison, Army chaplain
Michael Morrison (actor) (1946–2006), American pornographic actor and director
Michael Morrison (author) (born 1970), American author, software developer and toy inventor
Michael Morrison (footballer), currently playing for Charlton Athletic
Mike Morrison (ice hockey) (born 1979), American ice hockey player
Mike Morrison (baseball) (1867–1955), American Major League Baseball pitcher
Mike Morrison (basketball, born 1967), American basketball player
Mike Morrison (basketball, born 1989), American basketball player
Nancy Brysson Morrison (1903–1986), Scottish writer
Nigel Morrison, Vanuatuan footballer
Norman Morrison (1933–1965), American Vietnam War protester
Patricia Morison (1915–2018), American actress
Patricia Morrison (born 1962), American bass guitarist, singer and songwriter
Patricia Kennealy-Morrison (1946–2021), American author
Patrick W. Morrison (1866-1935), American lawyer, educator, and politician
Paul Morrison (artist) (born 1966), English painter
Paul Morrison (director) (born 1944), British film director & screenwriter
Paul J. Morrison (born 1954), American politician and lawyer
Peter Reed Morrison (1919–2019), American physiologist
Phil Morrison (baseball), American baseball player for the Pittsburgh Pirates
Phil Morrison (director) (born 1968), American movie director
Phil Morrison (driver), British race driver
Phil Morrison (yachts) (born 1946), British yacht designer
Philip Morrison (1915–2005), American physicist involved with the Manhattan Project
Philip J. Morrison (born 1950) American physicist in the field of hydrodynamics and plasma physics and a professor at the University of Texas
Piercy Morrison (1868–1936), English rugby union player
Ravel Morrison (born 1993), English footballer
Ray Morrison (1885–1982), American athlete and coach
Reece Morrison (born 1945), American football player
Sir Richard Morrison (1767–1849),  Irish architect
Richard Morrison (ambassador) (16th century), Edward VI's ambassador to Charles V
Richard Morrison (Neighbours), fictional character from the soap opera Neighbours
Richard James Morrison (1795–1874), English astrologer
Richard T. Morrison, United States Tax Court judge
Rob Morrison (journalist) (born 1968), American television journalist
Rob Morrison (scientist) (born 1942), Australian zoological researcher and science communicator.
Robbie Morrison, British comics writer
Robert Morison (1620–1683), Scottish botanist
Robert Morrison, 1st Baron Morrison (1881–1953), British Labour Party politician
Robert Morrison (footballer), New Zealand international football player
Robert Morrison (missionary) (1782–1834), first Protestant missionary to China in 1807
Robert Morrison (Phi Delta Theta) (1822–1902), one of the founders of Phi Delta Theta, an international fraternity
Robert Morrison (rower) (1902–1980), British rower, gold medal winner at the 1924 Summer Olympics
Robert Morrison (soccer) (died 1952), Scottish American soccer half back
Robert F. Morrison (c. 1840 – 1887), 13th Chief Justice of the Supreme Court of California
Robert J. H. Morrison (born 1961), Canadian academic
Ronald Hugh Morrieson (1922–1972), New Zealand writer
Ruia Morrison (born 1936), tennis player from New Zealand
Samuel Eliot Morison (1887–1976), American historian
Scott Morrison (born 1968), Australian politician
Scott Morrison (basketball player), Canadian professional basketball player
Scott Morrison (footballer) (born 1984), Scottish association football player
Scott Morrison (journalist), Canadian sports writer
Sean Morrison (beach volleyball)
Sean Morrison (footballer)
Sean J. Morrison, American biology professor
Shelley Morrison (1936–2019), American actress
Sophia Morrison (1859–1917), Manx cultural activist, folklore collector and writer
Sterling Morrison (1942–1995), American musician
Steve Morison (born 1983), English born Welsh international footballer
Steve Morrison (American football), former Indianapolis Colt
Steve Morrison (footballer), Scottish footballer
Steve Morrison (radio personality), American radio DJ
Stevie Morrison, British yachtsman
Terry Morrison (academic), Canadian academic
Terry Morrison (politician), state legislator from Maine
Temuera Morrison (born 1960), New Zealand actor
Theodore Nevin Morrison (1850–1929), Episcopal Bishop in the United States
Thomas Brash Morison (1868–1945), Scottish politician and judge
Thomas David Morrison (1796–1856), Canadian doctor and politician
Thomas Morrison (actor) (born 1983), English television actor
Tom Morrison (baseball) (1869–1902), American baseball player
Tom Morrison (footballer) (1904–?), Scottish footballer
Tommy Morrison (1969–2013), American boxer
Tommy Morrison (footballer, born 1874) (1874–1940), Irish footballer
Tommy Morrison (footballer born 1943), Scottish footballer
Toni Morrison (1931–2019), American author, Nobel Prize winner
Van Morrison (born 1945), Northern Irish singer/songwriter
Walter Frederick Morrison (1920–2010), American inventor of the frisbee
Walter "Junie" Morrison (1954–2017), American funk musician, member of the Ohio Players
William Morrison (Alberta politician), former member of the Legislative Assembly of Alberta
William "Bill" Morrison (1928–2013), member of the Australian House of Representatives
William Morrison (businessman), founder of the Morrisons supermarket chain
William Morrison (dentist), American dentist
William Morrison (director), music video director and musician
William Morrison, 1st Viscount Dunrossil (1893–1961), British politician and Governor General of Australia
William Morrison (gardener), plant collector employed by Kew, 1824–39
William Morrison (missionary), American missionary based in the Congo Free State
William Morrison (trader), Canadian fur trader active in Minnesota
Joseph Samachson (1906–1980), biochemist and science-fiction writer under the pseudonym William Morrison
William Garth Morrison (1943–2013), Chief Scout of the United Kingdom and Overseas Territories
William R. Morrison (Canadian historian) (born 1947)
William Ralls Morrison, U.S. Representative from Illinois
William Robert Morrison (1878–1947), Canadian politician and Mayor of Hamilton, Ontario

See also
Morison (surname)
Clan Morrison, a Scottish Highland clan of Lewis, Harris and Sutherland
Dùn_Èistean, traditionally a stronghold of the Clan Morrison of Lewis
Viscount Dunrossil, a title in the United Kingdom Peerage
Baron Morrison, a title in the United Kingdom Peerage
Morrison-Bell Baronets, a Baronetage of the United Kingdom
Durness, an area in Sutherland where Clan Morrisons live with their traditional allies, the Clan Mackay
Ness, Lewis, an ancestral home of the Lewis Morrisons
Gilmore, a sept name of Morrison/ Morison
Gilhemoire, progenitor of the Scottish Clan Morrison, and half-brother to Leod
Pabbay, Harris, traditionally a home of the Clan Morrison
Barvas, site of a battle between the Morrisons and Macauleys of Lewis

References

Bibliography

Black, George F. (1946). The Surnames of Scotland: Their Origin, Meaning, and History, New York, The New York Public Library.
Cameron, Anne. (2007). The Establishment of Civil Registration in Scotland, Cambridge, England, Historical Journal, 50 (2), pp 377–395.
Fairbairn, James. (1905). Crests of the families of Great Britain and Ireland.
Fraser, William (1869). The Chiefs of Colquhoun and their country, Vol 2, Edinburgh.
Huntley, C. G., Marquis of. (1894). The records of Aboyne MCCXXX-MDCLXXXI, Printed for the New Spalding Club, Milne and Hutchison, Aberdeen. 
MacCoinnich, A. (2015). Dùn Èistean: the historical background, c. 1493 – c.1700. In: Barrowman, R.C. (ed.) Dùn Èistean, Ness: The Excavation of a Clan Stronghold. Acair Press, Stornoway.
Moir, Alexander L. (1913). Moir Genealogy and Collateral Lines. Union Printing Co., Lowell, Massachusetts.
Morrison, Alexander W, (2016). The Genealogy of the Morrison Origins in Scotland: A critical evaluation of the historical evidence for the origins of the Morrisons in Scotland, On Line, Academia.
Morrison, L. A. (1880). The history of the Morison or Morrison family with most of the "Traditions of the Morrisons" (clan Mac Gillemhuire), heredity judges to 1880, A Williams and Co., Boston, Massachusetts.
Munro, A. M. (1897). Memorials of the Aldermen, Provosts and Lord Provosts of Aberdeen 1272–1895, Aberdeen. 
Nelson, P and Hinson, C. (2001). Yorkshire: Some of the Subsidy Rolls (Poll Tax) for the year 1379, Yorkshire Archaeological and Topographical Journals, with the agreement of the Yorkshire Archaeological Society, Geniuk.
Scotlands People, Church Registers – Old Parish Registers Banns and Marriages, FR3914, 120 202, Aberdeen. 
Trevor-Roper, H. (2014). The Invention of Scotland, Myth and History, Yale University Press, London.

Anglicised Scottish Gaelic-language surnames
English-language surnames
Scottish surnames
Surnames of Ulster-Scottish origin
Patronymic surnames